Maroochydore State High School (commonly abbreviated as 'MSHS') is a co-educational, state secondary school located on Queensland's Sunshine Coast in the town of Maroochydore, approximately  north of Brisbane.
It has grown from an enrolment of 200 students in its foundation year, 1964, to approximately 1400 today. Considered the central high school of Maroochydore, it is particularly noted for being a Cricket School of Excellence.

Awards
 Queensland Schoolboy Cricket Champions 2007

Notable alumni
Leanne Evans (Commonwealth Games silver medalist)
Eric Hipwood (AFL player for the Brisbane Lions)
Grant Kenny OAM (Aust. Ironman title. Bronze in Olympic Kayaking)
Mal Meninga AM (Aust. Rugby League)
Jessica Watson OAM (Australian sailor)
Lisa Chesters (Aust Federal Member of Parliament)

References

External links
School website

High schools in Queensland
Schools on the Sunshine Coast, Queensland
Maroochydore
1964 establishments in Australia
Educational institutions established in 1964